Kankrej is a city and Municipal council in Banaskantha district in the Gujarat state of India.

History 
The Kankrej was ruled by Koli chieftains during British Raj in India.

The Kolis of Kankrej were most rebellious against Muslim rulers and British Raj in India.

References 

Cities and towns in Banaskantha district